Sindal Airport is an airport in Sindal, Denmark.

References

Airports in Denmark
Buildings and structures in the North Jutland Region
Transport in the North Jutland Region